The Afrikahaus is an office building at Große Reichenstraße 27 in the German city of Hamburg. It was built in 1899 as the headquarters of the C. Woermann firm (including the Woermann-Linie) by the Hamburg architect Martin Haller and was given listed monument status in 1972.

Construction 

The Afrikahaus was commissioned by Adolph Woermann and Eduard Woermann in 1899 to serve as an office for the C. Woermann trading company; the operator of the Woermann-Linie and the Deutsche Ost-Afrika Linie.  In order for construction to take place, Haus Große Reichenstraße 31, an old Hamburg Mansion, was demolished.

The architect Martin Haller designed the facade to emphasize the exotic nature of its primary tenant. To further reflect this, the buildings colors were those of the Woermann line.

Location 
The Afrikahaus is centrally located in Hamburg's inner city, between the shopping street, Mönckebergstraße, the Hamburg City Hall and the warehouse district, Speicherstadt. To the west is another notable office building, the Zürichhaus.

The building as a monument 
The "Afrikahaus" was protected in 1972 as an example of Hamburg Kontorhaus Architecture. When built in 1900 it combined then modern construction techniques and practicality. Because of its status, the building is regularly open on the "Day of Open Monuments", with guided tours of the Afrikahaus provided for visitors.

The building was closed for renovations for a few years, but reopened in February 1999 with modern office space. During the renovation, special care was taken to ensure that architectural features such as cast iron supports, vaulted ceilings, doors, and a wall mosaic with African Motifs and Elephants were preserved.

Today 
The building is now family owned, and is rented out to various firms. Companies that currently rent space in the building include, pilot group, Deutsche Personalberatung - DPB - GmbH & Co. KG, EURO I AG, IPHH Internet Port Hamburg GmbH, HEAVEN'S DOOR event agentur GmbH, Careerteam GmbH, SNM Style Net Media GmbH, and the restaurant Estancia Steak. Since the buildings construction, C. Woermann GmbH & Co has been a tenant.

References

External links
 Homepage of the Afrikahaus

Buildings and structures in Hamburg-Mitte
Office buildings in Germany
Office buildings completed in 1899
1899 establishments in Germany
19th-century architecture in Germany